Paul Blackwell (11 July 1954 – 24 February 2019) was an Australian stage actor and occasional film actor.

Early life 
He attended the National Institute of Dramatic Art from 1980 to 1982 and appeared in many productions from some of Australia's best-known theatre companies, including Company B, Sydney Theatre Company, State Theatre Company of South Australia, Patch Theatre and Opera Australia.
 
He appeared in several films, though often in small parts. His only major film role was in the 1996 film The Quiet Room directed by Rolf De Heer—it was critically acclaimed and was screened as part of the main competition of the 1996 Cannes Film Festival. In the last decades of his life, appearances included Candy, directed by Neil Armfield and starring Heath Ledger, Geoffrey Rush and Abbie Cornish; December Boys, starring Daniel Radcliffe; Hey, Hey, It's Esther Blueburger; and the silent film Dr. Plonk—another collaboration with Rolf De Heer.

In 2017 Blackwell toured Australia playing Parsons in Headlong, Almeida Theatre and Nottingham Playhouse's production of Duncan MacMillan and Robert Icke's adaptation of George Orwell's 1984 for GWB Entertainment, Ambassador Theatre Group Asia Pacific and State Theatre Company of South Australia.

In 2019 Blackwell received a Premier’s Award for Lifetime Achievement posthumously in the South Australian Ruby Awards.

References

External links

1954 births
2019 deaths
Australian male stage actors
Australian male film actors
National Institute of Dramatic Art alumni